The 1975 Australian Rally Championship was a series of seven rallying events held across Australia. It was the eighth season in the history of the competition.

Ross Dunkerton and navigator John Large in the Datsun 240Z were the winners of the 1975 Championship.

Season review

The eighth Australian Rally Championship was once again held over seven events across Australia.  This season consisted of two events each for Victoria and New South Wales, and one each in Queensland, South Australia and Western Australia.  The 1975 season saw domination of the Datsun 240Z's, with Dunkerton and Large winning convincingly (three wins, two seconds and a third) from McLeod and Mortimer.

The Rallies

The seven events of the 1975 season were as follows.

Round One – Mazda House 1000 Rally

Round Two – Toms Tyres 1600 Rally

Round Three – Akademos Rally

Round Four – Bega Valley Rally

Round Five – Warana Rally

Round Six – Walker Trophy Rally

Round Seven – Alpine Rally

1975 Drivers and Navigators Championships
Final pointscore for 1975 is as follows.

Ross Dunkerton – Champion Driver 1975

John Large – Champion Navigator 1975

References

External links
  Results of Snowy Mountains Rally and ARC results.

Rally Championship
Rally competitions in Australia
1975 in rallying